Tuulos (also ) is a former municipality of Finland. It was consolidated with Hämeenlinna on January 1, 2009. The administrative center of Tuulos was Syrjäntaka.

Neighbouring municipalities were Hauho, Hämeenlinna, Janakkala and Lammi.

It is located in the province of Southern Finland and is part of the Tavastia Proper region. The municipality had a population of 1,536 (2003) and covered an area of 171.24 km² of which 13.14 km² is water. The population density is 9.7 inhabitants per km².  The municipality is unilingually Finnish.

Gallery

External links

The Official Tuulos Website
Tuulos in Google Maps

Populated places disestablished in 2009
2009 disestablishments in Finland
Former municipalities of Finland
Hämeenlinna